Julia Fox (born February 2, 1990) is an Italian-American actress and model. As an actress, she is known for her debut performance in the 2019 film Uncut Gems, for which she was nominated for the Breakthrough Actor Award at the 2019 Gotham Awards.

Early life and education 
Fox was born in Milan to an Italian mother and an American father. She spent her early years living with her grandfather. In Italy, she lived in a one-bedroom apartment with her family, though she noted that she "never felt like we were poor there, life wasn't hectic. Everything around was deserted but full of love and lots of good food." At the age of six, she moved to New York City with her father and lived in Yorkville, Manhattan. She then briefly moved back to Italy for two years when she was 14, but by that time she felt the cultural differences conflicting. She worked several service jobs including at a shoe store, an ice cream shop, and a pastry shop. Fox attended City-As-School High School and worked as a dominatrix for six months.

Career

Modeling, art, and fashion design
Fox started as a clothing designer and launched a successful women's knitwear luxe line, Franziska Fox, with her friend Briana Andalore. She also worked as a model, posing for the last nude edition of Playboy in 2015, and as an exhibiting painter and photographer. She self-published two books of photography, Symptomatic of a Relationship Gone Sour: Heartburn/Nausea, published in 2015, and PTSD, published in 2016. In 2017, Fox hosted an art exhibit titled "R.I.P. Julia Fox'", which featured silk canvases painted with her own blood.

She has since appeared in campaigns for Diesel Coach New York, and Supreme; and in editorials for CR Fashion Book, The Last, Office, Wonderland, Vogue, Vogue Italia, The Face, Paper, V, Interview, as well as on the cover of Vogue Czechoslovakia.

Acting and directing
Fox made her feature film debut in the 2019 Safdie brothers Netflix film Uncut Gems, playing a showroom saleswoman and mistress of the film's protagonist Howard Ratner (played by Adam Sandler), an erratic jewelry dealer and gambling addict. Fox had known the Safdie brothers for almost a decade after meeting Josh Safdie through a chance encounter at a café in SoHo, Manhattan. She was subsequently nominated for Breakthrough Actor in the 2019 Gotham Awards.

Fox also wrote and directed Fantasy Girls, a short film about a group of teenage girls involved in sex work living in Reno, Nevada, which was released in 2021. She starred in Ben Hozie's PVT Chat, playing a cam girl named Scarlet. The film was released in the United States on February 5, 2021. She was seen in No Sudden Move which released in the United States on July 1, 2021.

She starred in the drama movie Puppet, which was released in late 2022.  Fox is also set to portray Hollywood hairdresser Carrie White in upcoming biopic Upper Cut based on White's memoir. In March 2022, it was announced that Fox is set to star in the dark comedy The Trainer opposite Vito Schnabel, who also writes, and Steven Van Zandt, led by director Tony Kaye.

Personal life 
In November 2018, Fox married private pilot Peter Artemiev. Their divorce was finalized in July 2020. They resided together in Yorkville, Manhattan. Their son was born on January 17, 2021; Fox announced the birth on February 14. In October 2022, she said that she experienced postpartum depression. She also stated that she has obsessive–compulsive disorder (OCD) and attention deficit hyperactive disorder (ADHD),  and that she is autistic.

In January 2022, Fox confirmed that she was dating rapper Kanye West in an article she wrote for Interview. They broke up the following month. Fox later claimed she dated West to "give people something to talk about" amid the COVID-19 pandemic and to "get him off Kim's case". Shortly after the breakup, a doctored headline of Fox claiming the relationship ended due to West's dislike of her going "goblin mode" went viral online, prompting the phrase "goblin mode" to become widely used. Fox confirmed that the headline was false.

Filmography

Film

Television

Music video

Awards and nominations

References

External links 
 

1990 births
Living people
21st-century American actresses
21st-century Italian actresses
Actresses from Milan
American female models
American people of Italian descent
Italian female models
Italian people of American descent
Actors with autism
People with attention deficit hyperactivity disorder
People with obsessive–compulsive disorder